is a Japanese professional footballer who plays as a centre back for J2 League club Omiya Ardija, on loan from FC Tokyo.

Career statistics

Club
.

References

External links

2002 births
Living people
People from Musashimurayama, Tokyo
Association football people from Tokyo
Japanese footballers
Japan youth international footballers
Association football defenders
J1 League players
J2 League players
J3 League players
FC Tokyo players
FC Tokyo U-23 players
FC Ryukyu players
Omiya Ardija players